Events from the year 1997 in Portuguese Macau.

Incumbents
 Governor - Vasco Joaquim Rocha Vieira

Events
 21 March - The opening of Natural and Agrarian Museum in Coloane.
 16 November - the 1997 Macau Grand Prix

References 

 
Years of the 20th century in Macau
Macau
Macau
1990s in Macau